Gorno Selo is a village in the municipality of Dolneni, North Macedonia. The meaning of the name is: Upper village.

Demographics
According to the 2021 census, the village had a total of 7 inhabitants. Ethnic groups in the village include:

Macedonians 7

References

Villages in Dolneni Municipality